Jeremy Williams (born in Australia) is an Australian rugby union player who plays for the  in Super Rugby. His playing position is lock. He was named in the Waratahs squad for the 2021 Super Rugby AU season. He had previously been named in the  squads for the 2019 and 2020 Super Rugby seasons, but didn't make any appearances.

Reference list

External links
Rugby.com.au profile
itsrugby.co.uk profile

Australian rugby union players
Living people
Rugby union locks
Year of birth missing (living people)
Rugby union flankers
New South Wales Waratahs players
Western Force players